Hazel is a side platformed Sacramento RT light rail station in Gold River, California, United States. The station was opened on October 15, 2005, and is operated by the Sacramento Regional Transit District. It is served by the Gold Line. The station is located on Folsom Boulevard at Rocket Circle, two blocks east of Hazel Avenue.

Platforms and tracks

References

Sacramento Regional Transit light rail stations
Railway stations in the United States opened in 2005